Gerard Peter Kuiper (born Gerrit Pieter Kuiper; 7 December 1905 – 23 December 1973) was a Dutch astronomer, planetary scientist, selenographer, author and professor. He is the eponymous namesake of the Kuiper belt.

Kuiper is considered by many to be the father of modern planetary science.

Early life and career
Kuiper, the son of a tailor in the village of Tuitjenhorn in North Holland, had an early interest in astronomy. He had extraordinarily sharp eyesight, allowing him to see with the naked eye magnitude 7.5 stars, about four times fainter than those visible to normal eyes.

He studied at Leiden University in 1924, where at the time a very large number of astronomers had congregated. He befriended fellow students Bart Bok and Pieter Oosterhoff, and was taught by Ejnar Hertzsprung, Antonie Pannekoek, Willem de Sitter, Jan Woltjer, Jan Oort, and the physicist Paul Ehrenfest. He received his candidate degree in Astronomy in 1927 and continued straight on with his graduate studies.

Kuiper finished his doctoral thesis on binary stars with Hertzsprung in 1933, after which he traveled to California to become a fellow under Robert Grant Aitken at the Lick Observatory. In 1935 he left to work at the Harvard College Observatory, where he met Sarah Parker Fuller, whom he married on 20 June 1936. Although he had planned to move to Java to work at the Bosscha Observatory, he took a position at Yerkes Observatory of the University of Chicago and became an American citizen in 1937.

From 1947 to 1949, Kuiper served as the director of the McDonald Observatory in west Texas.  
In 1949, Kuiper initiated the Yerkes–McDonald asteroid survey (1950–1952).

As professor at the University of Chicago, he was dissertation advisor to Carl Sagan. In 1958, the two worked on the classified military Project A119, a secret Air Force plan to detonate a nuclear warhead on the Moon.

Discoveries
Kuiper discovered two natural satellites of planets in the Solar System, namely Uranus's satellite Miranda and Neptune's satellite Nereid. In addition, he discovered carbon dioxide in the atmosphere of Mars, and the existence of a methane-laced atmosphere above Saturn's satellite Titan in 1944. Kuiper also pioneered airborne infrared observing using a Convair 990 aircraft in the 1960s.

Kuiper spent most of his career at the University of Chicago, but moved to Tucson, Arizona, in 1960 to found the Lunar and Planetary Laboratory at the University of Arizona. Kuiper served as the laboratory's director for the rest of his life. One of the three buildings at Arizona that makes up the LPL is named in his honor.

In the 1950s Kuiper's interdisciplinary collaboration with the geochemist and Nobel Laureate Harold C. Urey to understand the Moon's thermal evolution descended into acrimony, as the two engaged in what became known as the "Hot Moon Cold Moon" controversy. Their falling out, in part a scientific dispute, also reflected the challenge of maintaining professional relationships across overlapping but distinct scientific disciplines.

In the 1960s, Kuiper helped identify landing sites on the Moon for the Apollo program. His earlier work on the Moon included the Project A119, a secret Air Force plan to detonate a nuclear warhead on the Moon. Another scientist in the group was Carl Sagan, who was Kuiper's PhD student at the time of the project.

Kuiper discovered several binary stars which received "Kuiper numbers" to identify them, such as KUI 79.

Death 
Kuiper died of a heart attack on 23 December 1973 in Mexico City, while on vacation with his wife.

Honors

 In 1947, Kuiper was awarded the Prix Jules Janssen of the Société astronomique de France (Astronomical Society of France).
 In 1959, Kuiper won the Henry Norris Russell Lectureship of the American Astronomical Society.
In 1971, Kuiper received the Kepler Gold Medal from the American Association for the Advancement of Science and the Franklin Institute.

Besides the minor planet 1776 Kuiper, three craters (Mercurian, lunar, and Martian), Kuiper Scarp in Antarctica, and the now-decommissioned Kuiper Airborne Observatory was also named after him.

Astronomers refer to a region of minor planets beyond Neptune as the "Kuiper belt", since Kuiper had suggested that such small planets or comets may have formed there. However Kuiper himself believed that such objects would have been swept clear by planetary gravitational perturbations, so that none or few would exist there today.

The Kuiper Prize, named in his honor, is the most distinguished award given by the American Astronomical Society's Division for Planetary Sciences, an international society of professional planetary scientists.

Episode 6 ("The Man of a Trillion Worlds") of the TV series Cosmos: Possible Worlds featured the Kuiper–Urey conflict.

Notes

References

External links

 
 
 

 
1905 births
1973 deaths
20th-century American astronomers
American science writers
American encyclopedists
20th-century Dutch astronomers
Dutch science writers
Dutch essayists
Dutch encyclopedists
Dutch emigrants to the United States
Discoverers of moons
Planetary scientists
Selenographers
Leiden University alumni
Harvard University staff
University of Arizona faculty
University of Chicago faculty
People from Harenkarspel
20th-century American essayists
Harvard College Observatory people
Members of the United States National Academy of Sciences
Manhattan Project people
20th-century cartographers